In basketball, a three-point field goal (also known as a "three-pointer" or "3-pointer") is a field goal made from beyond the three-point line, a designated arc radiating from the basket. A successful attempt is worth three points, in contrast to the two points awarded for shots made inside the three-point line. The National Basketball Association's (NBA) three-point shooting title is the player who recorded the most three-point field goals in a given season. The statistic was first recognized in the 1979–80 season, when the three-point line was first implemented. Stephen Curry has won it a record 7 times while James Harden and Ray Allen have won it thrice.

Key

Annual leaders

Notes

References
General

Specific

National Basketball Association lists
National Basketball Association statistical leaders